In the theory of general relativity, and differential geometry more generally, Schild's ladder is a first-order method for approximating parallel transport of a vector along a curve using only affinely parametrized geodesics.  The method is named for Alfred Schild, who introduced the method during lectures at Princeton University.

Construction 

Formally, consider a curve γ through a point A0 in a Riemannian manifold M, and let x be a tangent vector at A0.  Then x can be identified with a geodesic segment A0X0 via the exponential map. This geodesic σ satisfies

 

The steps of the Schild's ladder construction are:
 Let X0 = σ(1), so the geodesic segment  has unit length.
 Now let A1 be a point on γ close to A0, and construct the geodesic X0A1.
 Let P1 be the midpoint  of X0A1 in the sense that the segments X0P1 and P1A1 take an equal affine parameter to traverse. 
 Construct the geodesic A0P1, and extend it to a point X1 so that the parameter length of A0X1 is double that of A0P1.
 Finally construct the geodesic A1X1.  The tangent to this geodesic x1 is then the parallel transport of X0 to A1, at least to first order.

Approximation 
This is a discrete approximation of the continuous process of parallel transport. If the ambient space is flat, this is exactly parallel transport, and the steps define parallelograms, which agree with the Levi-Civita parallelogramoid.

In a curved space, the error is given by holonomy around the triangle  which is equal to the integral of the curvature over the interior of the triangle, by the Ambrose-Singer theorem; this is a form of Green's theorem (integral around a curve related to integral over interior), and in the case of Levi-Civita connections on surfaces, of Gauss–Bonnet theorem.

Notes 
 Schild's ladder requires not only geodesics but also relative distance along geodesics. Relative distance may be provided by affine parametrization of geodesics, from which the required midpoints may be determined.
 The parallel transport which is constructed by Schild's ladder is necessarily torsion-free.
 A Riemannian metric is not required to generate the geodesics. But if the geodesics are generated from a Riemannian metric, the parallel transport which is constructed in the limit by Schild's ladder is the same as the Levi-Civita connection because this connection is defined to be torsion-free.

References
.
 

Connection (mathematics)
First order methods